Tetratoma is a genus of polypore fungus beetles in the family Tetratomidae. There are about 25 described species in Tetratoma.

Species

 Tetratoma ainu (Nakane, 1963)
 Tetratoma ancora Fabricius, 1790
 Tetratoma baudueri Perris, 1864
 Tetratoma bicoloripes (Pic, 1934)
 Tetratoma canadensis Nikitsky, 2004
 Tetratoma concolor LeConte, 1879
 Tetratoma crenicollis Baudi, 1877
 Tetratoma cyanoptera Champion, 1924
 Tetratoma desmarestii Latreille, 1807
 Tetratoma fungorum Fabricius, 1790
 Tetratoma fuscoguttata Nikitsky, 1998
 Tetratoma japonica Miyatake, 1955
 Tetratoma longipennis (Casey, 1900)
 Tetratoma nepalensis Nikitsky, 1998
 Tetratoma nobuchii Nakane, 1955
 Tetratoma pictipennis Reitter, 1896
 Tetratoma sakagutii Nakane, 1955
 Tetratoma talyshensis Nikitsky, 1989
 Tetratoma tedaldi Reitter, 1887
 Tetratoma tessellata Melsheimer, 1844
 Tetratoma truncorum LeConte, 1866
 Tetratoma variegata (Casey, 1900)
 Tetratoma virgo Motschulsky 1845
 Tetratoma wittmeri Nikitsky, 1998
 Tetratoma yunnanensis Nikitsky, 2016
 †Tetratoma nikitskyi Alekseev, 2013

References

Further reading

External links

 

Tenebrionoidea
Articles created by Qbugbot
Tenebrionoidea genera